Nume (also called Gog and Tarasag) is an Oceanic language spoken on Gaua island in Vanuatu. Its 700 speakers live on the northeast coast of Gaua.

Nume is a distinct language from its immediate southern neighbors, Mwerlap and Dorig.

Names
The name Nume originates in the name of a village, now abandoned. Tarasag is currently the community's main village. The alternate name Gog refers to the broader area, and by extension, to the island.

Phonology
Nume has 15 consonant phonemes.

 /β/ can also be heard as [ɸ] among speakers.

Nume has 7 phonemic vowels, which are all short monophthongs.

{| class="wikitable" style="text-align:center"
|+ Vowels
!
! Front
! Back
|-
!Close
|  
|  
|-
!Near-close
|  
|  
|-
!Open-mid
|  
|  
|-
!Open
| colspan="2"|  
|}

Grammar
The system of personal pronouns in Nume contrasts clusivity, and distinguishes four numbers (singular, dual, trial, plural).

Spatial reference in Nume is based on a system of geocentric (absolute) directionals, which is typical of Oceanic languages.

References

Bibliography

 .

External links
 Linguistic map of north Vanuatu, showing range of Nume on Gaua.
 Audio recordings in the Nume language, in open access, by A. François (source: Pangloss Collection).
 U Line Tatar Ve Vosog Le Ale Gavrund Simplified Anglican Morning and Evening Prayer in Nume (c. 1965), digitized by Richard Mammana.

Languages of Vanuatu
Banks–Torres languages
Torba Province